UAAP Season 78 was the 2015–2016 athletic year of the University Athletic Association of the Philippines (UAAP). It opened on September 5, 2015, almost two months after the usual July opening of the league during previous seasons, due to the shift in the academic calendars of four member universities, i.e. Ateneo, La Salle, UP and UST. It was hosted by the University of the Philippines.

The eight-member universities of the UAAP competed in fifteen sports to vie for the general championship title.

Opening ceremony
The opening ceremonies of the UAAP Season 78 was held last September 5, 2015 at the Smart Araneta Coliseum. "Philippine Archipelago" was the theme for the opening. A festive dance number featuring the rich history of the country and the eight vintas, consisting of eight universities of the UAAP, was performed by UP Dance & Performance groups including UP Streetdance Club, UP Dance Company, UP Dancesport Society, UP Filipiniana Dance Group, ROTC Symphonic Band, Tugma and the UP Pep Squad.

It was well attended with high officials from the UAAP Board and ABS-CBN Sports present. The host's (UP) President Alfredo Pascual and UP Diliman Chancellor Michael Tan formally opened the season. This was followed with the parade of athletes and the awarding presentation of the UAAP Season 77 general championship trophies.

A basketball double header to start off the 1st elimination round, UP vs. UE at 2p.m. and Adamson vs. UST at 4p.m. followed after the opening ceremonies.

The following day at the Mall of Asia Arena, La Salle faced reigning champion NU and FEU battled Ateneo, while Women's Basketball festivities started on the same day at the Blue Eagle Gym.

A Press conference was also held at Gateway Cubao, few days before the opening.

Sports calendar

First semester

Second semester

Basketball

The UAAP Season 78 seniors' division basketball tournament began on September 5, 2015. The tournament host eas the University of the Philippines and the tournament commissioner was Atty. Rene "Rebo" Saguisag, Jr together with his deputies Romy Guevarra, Joe Lipa and Bai Cristobal. Referees from BRASCU will be hired for officiating. UAAP adopts FIBA rules on technicals, timeouts, among others.

The UAAP Season 78 juniors division basketball tournament started on November 14, 2015. The tournament venue was at the Ateneo Blue Eagle Gym. FEU was the tournament host. The Ateneo Blue Eaglets were the defending champions.

At the end of the tournament, the FEU Tamaraws won the Men's Basketball title in a best-of-three game finals series against the UST Growling Tigers which ended on December 2, 2015.

Seniors' division

Men's tournament

Elimination round

Team standings

Playoffs

Awards
 Season Most Valuable Player: 
 Finals Most Valuable Player: 
 Rookie of the Year:

Women's tournament

Elimination round

Team standings

Playoffs

Awards
 Most Valuable Player: 
 Rookie of the Year:

Juniors' division

Boys' tournament

Elimination round

Team standings

Playoffs

Awards
 Most Valuable Player: 
 Rookie of the Year:

Volleyball

Seniors' division
The UAAP Season 78 seniors' division volleyball tournament started on January 31, 2016. The tournament main venue is the Filoil Flying V Arena in  San Juan City while selected games will be played at the Smart Araneta Coliseum in Cubao, Quezon City, the Philsports Arena in Pasig, and the Mall of Asia Arena in Pasay. The tournament host is the University of the Philippines. Noreen Go is the tournament commissioner while the Deputy Commissioner and Asst. Deputy Commissioner are Sherwin Malonzo and Ivan Isada, respectively. Referees from the Philippine Volleyball Federation (PVF) headed by Nestor Bello will be used for the tournament's officiating purposes.

Men's tournament

Elimination round

Team standings

Playoffs

Awards
 Season Most Valuable Player: 
 Finals Most Valuable Player: 
 Rookie of the Year:

Women's tournament

Elimination round

Team standings

Playoffs

Awards
 Season Most Valuable Player: 
 Finals Most Valuable Player: 
 Rookie of the Year:

Juniors' division
The UAAP Season 78 Juniors volleyball tournament will start on August 22, 2015. The tournament venue will be at the Adamson University Gym in San Marcelino St., Ermita, Manila. Adamson is the tournament host. The number of participating schools in the boys' and girls' tournaments both increased to seven. Far Eastern University fielded boys' and girls' volleyball teams beginning season 77. Since there are now seven participating schools, the tournaments will have a Final Four format. The UAAP Board decided to move the high school volleyball tournaments from 2nd semester to 1st semester due to the basketball juniors tournament being moved from the 1st semester to 2nd semester.

Boys' tournament

Elimination round

Awards
 Most Valuable Player: 
 Rookie of the Year:

Girls' tournament

Elimination round

Awards
 Most Valuable Player: 
 Rookie of the Year:

Beach volleyball
The UAAP Season 78 beach volleyball tournament began on October 9, 2015. The tournament venue was at the Sands at SM by the Bay SM Mall of Asia in Pasay, Metro Manila. University of Santo Tomas was the tournament host. Beach volleyball is a single round-robin elimination tournament.

Men's tournament

Elimination round

 Team standings

 Match-up results

Playoffs

Awards
 Most Valuable Player: 
 Rookie of the Year:

Women's tournament

Elimination round

 Team standings

 Match-up results

Playoffs

Awards
 Most Valuable Player: 
 Rookie of the Year:

Football

The UAAP Season 78 seniors' division football tournament started on February 7, 2016 at the Emperador McKinley Hill Stadium at Fort Bonifacio, Taguig City. The other tournament venues will be at the Moro Lorenzo Football Field of Ateneo de Manila University in Katipunan Ave., Loyola Heights, Quezon City and at the FEU Diliman Football Field. The tournament host is Ateneo with Jojo Rodriguez as the tournament commissioner.

Seniors' division

Men's tournament

Elimination round

Team standings

Match-up results

Playoffs

Awards
 Most Valuable Player: 
 Rookie of the Year:

Women's tournament

Elimination round

Team standings

Match-up results

Finals
FT:  UP 2 v 1 DLSU

Awards
 Most Valuable Player: 
 Rookie of the Year:

Juniors' division
The UAAP Season 78 juniors division football tournament started on December 5, 2015 and ended on February 7, 2016 at the Moro Lorenzo Football Field in the Ateneo de Manila campus in Loyola Heights, Quezon City. FEU-Diliman was crowned as the champion of the tournament.

Boys' Tournament

Elimination round

Team standings

Match-up results

Scores

Results to the right and top of the gray cells are first round games, those to the left and below are second round games.

Playoffs

Finals

Awards
Most Valuable Player: 
Rookie of the Year: 
Best Striker: 
Best Midfielder: 
Best Defender: 
Best Goalkeeper: 
Fair Play Award:

Baseball

Men's tournament
The UAAP Season 78 seniors' division baseball tournament began on February 4, 2016 at the Rizal Memorial Baseball Stadium in Malate Manila. The tournament host is La Salle.

Elimination round
 Team standings

 Match-up results

Scores
Results to the right and top of the gray cells are first round games, those to the left and below are second round games. Superscript is the number of innings played before the mercy rule applied.

Finals

Awards
 Most Valuable Player: 
 Rookie of the Year: 
 Best Hitter: 
 Best Slugger: 
 Best Pitcher: 
 Most Stolen Bases (8): 
 Most Runs Batted-In (12): ,  and 

Boys' tournament
The UAAP Season 78 juniors' division (demonstration sport) baseball tournament will begin on January 9, 2016 at the Rizal Memorial Baseball Stadium in Malate Manila. The tournament host is La Salle.

Elimination round

Team standings

Match-up results

Scores

Results to the right and top of the gray cells are first round games, those to the left and below are second round games. Superscript is the number of innings played before the mercy rule applied.

Finals

Awards
 Most Valuable Player: 
 Rookie of the Year:

Softball
The UAAP Season 78 softball tournament began on January 30, 2016 at the Rizal Memorial Baseball Stadium in Malate Manila. 
The tournament host is La Salle.

Women's tournament

Elimination round

 Team standings

 Match-up results

Scores

Results to the right and top of the gray cells are first round games, those to the left and below are second round games. Superscript is the number of innings played before the mercy rule applied.

Playoffs

Awards
 Most Valuable Player: 
 Rookie of the Year:

Badminton
The UAAP Season 78 badminton tournament began on September 19, 2015. The tournament venue was the Rizal Memorial Badminton Hall in Vito Cruz St., Malate, Manila. Badminton is a single round-robin elimination tournament. Far Eastern University was the tournament host.

Seniors' division

Men's tournament

Elimination round

 Team standings

 Match-up results

Playoffs

Awards
 Most Valuable Player: 
 Rookie of the Year:

Women's tournament

Elimination round

 Team standings

 Match-up results

Playoffs

Awards
 Most Valuable Player: 
 Rookie of the Year:

Table tennis
The UAAP Season 78 table tennis tournament began on October 17, 2015. The tournament venue was Ninoy Aquino Stadium. University of the East was the tournament host.

Seniors' division

Men's tournament

Elimination round

Team standings

Match-up results

Playoffs

Awards
 Most Valuable Player: 
 Rookie of the Year:

Women's tournament

Elimination round

Team standings

Match-up results

Playoffs

Awards
 Most Valuable Player: 
 Rookie of the Year:

Taekwondo
The UAAP Season 78 taekwondo tournament began on October 23, 2015. The tournament venue was the Ateneo Blue Eagle Gym in Loyola Heights, Quezon City, Metro Manila. Taekwondo is a single round-robin elimination tournament. Ateneo de Manila University was the tournament host.

Seniors' division

Men's tournament

Elimination round

 Team standings

 Match-up results

Awards
 Most Valuable Player: 
 Rookie of the Year:

Women's tournament

Elimination round

 Team standings

 Match-up results

Awards
 Most Valuable Player: 
 Rookie of the Year:

Juniors' division

Boys' tournament

Elimination round

Team standings

Match-up results

Awards
 Most Valuable Player:  
 Rookie of the Year:

Judo
The UAAP Season 78 Judo Championships was held from November 18–19, 2015 at the La Salle Greenhills Gym . The tournament host was De La Salle University.

Seniors' division

Men's tournament

Elimination round

Team standings

Event host in boldface

Awards
 Most Valuable Player: 
 Rookie of the Year:

Women's tournament

Elimination round

Team standings

Event host in boldface

Awards
 Most Valuable Player:  
 Rookie of the Year:

Juniors' division

Boys' tournament

Elimination round

Team standings

Event host in boldface

Awards
 Most Valuable Player:  
 Rookie of the Year:

Girls' tournament
This is a demonstration event.

Elimination round

Team standings

Event host in boldface

Awards
 Most Valuable Player: 
 Rookie of the Year:

Swimming
The UAAP Season 78 swimming championships was held on October 22–25, 2015 at the Rizal Memorial Swimming Pool in Vito Cruz St., Malate, Manila. The tournament host was National University and tournament commissioner was Richard G. Luna.

Team ranking is determined by a point system, similar to that of the overall championship. The points given are based on the swimmer's/team's finish in the finals of an event, which include only the top eight finishers from the preliminaries. The gold medalist(s) receive 15 points, silver gets 12, bronze has 10. The following points: 8, 6, 4, 2 and 1 are given to the rest of the participating swimmers/teams according to their order of finish.

Seniors' division

Men's tournament
Team standings
 
Rec - Number of new swimming records established
Event host in boldface

Awards
 Most Valuable Player: 
 Rookie of the Year:

Women's tournament
Team standings

Rec - Number of new swimming records established

Awards
 Most Valuable Player: 
 Rookie of the Year:

Juniors' division

Boys' tournament
Team standings

Rec - Number of new swimming records established
Event host in boldface

Awards
 Most Valuable Player: 
 Rookie of the Year:

Girls' tournament
Team standings

Rec - Number of new swimming records established

Event host in boldface

Awards
 Most Valuable Player: 
 Rookie of the Year:

Performance sports

Cheerdance
The UAAP Season 78 cheerdance competition was held on October 3, 2015 at the Mall of Asia Arena in Pasay. It was hosted by Boom Gonzalez and Sofia Andres and was well attended by 25, 388 spectators inside the arena, Cheerdance competition is an exhibition event. Points for the overall championship are not awarded to the participating schools.

Team standings
 
Order refers to order of performance.

Stunner Awardee: No Stunner Awardee for this year

 Special awards from sponsors:
 Purefoods Eats So Easy Move: Adamson
 Oishi Oh Wow Surprising Move: FEU
 Smart Fearless Jump: UST
 Yamaha Best Toss: UP
 PLDT Famtastic Pyramid: UP

Group stunts competition

Street dance
The 4th UAAP Street Dance Competition was held on April 9, 2016 at the Mall of Asia Arena in Pasay hosted by Upfront at the UAAP host Justin Quirino and Myx VJ Ai dela Cruz. Street dance competition is an exhibition event. Points for the general championship are not awarded to the participating schools. NU Underdawgz has decided to forgo their participation in this season's streetdance competition.

Host team in boldface.

General championship summary 
The general champion is determined by a point system. The system gives 15 points to the champion team of a UAAP event, 12 to the runner-up, and 10 to the third placer. The following points: 8, 6, 4, 2 and 1 are given to the rest of the participating teams according to their order of finish.

Medals table

Seniors' division

Juniors' division

General championship tally

Seniors' division

Juniors' division

Closing ceremony
The UAAP Season 78 closing ceremony was held at the Bahay ng Alumni of the UP-Diliman Campus. The highlight of the 5 p.m. event is the announcement of the league's Athlete of the Year. All MVPs from 15 sporting disciplines of the UAAP are eligible to win the Athlete of the Year award. The UAAP were given out special citations to student-athletes who excel in their academics and some who represent the country in local and international competitions.

The closing ceremony has also featured the turn-over of the flag of the UAAP to Season 79 host University of Santo Tomas.

Co-Athletes of the Year (Seniors)
Team Sports Category:
Alyssa Valdez (Ateneo / Women's Volleyball)
Queeny Sabobo (Adamson / Softball)
Individual Sports Category:
Jessie Khing Lacuna (Ateneo / Men's Swimming)
Ian Lariba (La Salle / Table Tennis)
Athlete of the Year (Juniors)
John Lloyd Osorio (UE / Track and Field)
Athlete Scholars Citations:
Alex Toni Steven Ngui (Ateneo / Men's Swimming)
David Camacho (Adamson / Men's Basketball)
David Angelo Diamante (La Salle / Men's Football)
Noelito Jose, Jr. (UST / Men's Fencing)
Mary Remy Palma (FEU / Women's Volleyball)
Cyrene Torres (NU / Women's Table Tennis)
Karen Cells (UE / Women's Taekwando)
Janna Dominique Oliva (UP / Poomsae)

Broadcast coverage
Starting from Season 78 until Season 82, ABS-CBN Sports will still the broadcast coverer of the UAAP. ABS-CBN Sports+Action, Balls HD 195 for the basketball tournament only and ABS-CBN Sports+Action International will cover the games on a live basis, with Finals games on ABS-CBN Channel 2 and ABS-CBN HD 167 and replays on ABS-CBN Sports+Action, they also introduced the newest batch of courtside reporters for the broadcast coverage. Laura Lehmann and Jeanine Tsoi, had returned as the courtside reporters for Ateneo and La Salle, with 6 new faces.

The High Definition channel will be aired on Balls HD 195 for the basketball tournament only after the said channel was ceased off. The HD channel has been transfer to ABS-CBN Sports+Action HD 166 for the volleyball tournament.

Aside from the refreshed line-up of the panel, including returnee Mico Halili (current anchor of CNN Philippines SportsDesk) who last worked with ABS-CBN Sports in the MBA Games and the league until Season 65 (2002), Anton Roxas and Allan Gregorio will not return to the UAAP basketball panel since they been returned to the NCAA basketball panel but Roxas will return for the UAAP volleyball panel. Noreen Go will also not return to the volleyball panel since she was chosen as a commissioner of the UAAP Volleyball tournament season 78. The coverage will have a pre-game show called "Upfront at the UAAP" every gamedays at 1:30pm, the show will delivered the latest updates and features in all of the sports disciplines of the league.

Anchors
Marielle Benitez (Football only)
Boom Gonzales (Basketball & Volleyball)
Bob Guerrero (Football only)
Mico Halili (Basketball only)
Jing Jamlang (Football only)
Ian Laurel  (Volleyball only)
TJ Manotoc (Basketball Finals & Football)
Nikko Ramos (Basketball only)
Anton Roxas (Volleyball only)
Eric Tipan (Basketball & Volleyball)

Analysts (Basketball)
Marco Benitez
Enzo Flojo
Christian Luanzon
TJ Manotoc
Renren Ritualo
Randy Sacdalan

Analysts (Volleyball)
Michele Gumabao
Ian Laurel
Denden Lazaro
Kirk Long
Ronnie Magsanoc
Mozzy Ravena
Anne Remulla-Canda
Ivy Remulla

Analysts (Football)
Natasha Alquiros
Marielle Benitez
Mikee Carrion
Darren Hartmann
Armand del Rosario

Courtside reporters
Stef Monce - Adamson
Laura Lehmann - Ateneo
Ganiel Krishnan - FEU
Jennine Tsoi - La Salle
Ira Pablo - NU
Paui Verzosa - UE
Nina Alvia - UP
Angelique Manto - UST

Upfront at the UAAP hosts
Bea Daez (Basketball & Volleyball)
Janeena Chan (Basketball & Volleyball)
Addie Manzano (Basketball & Volleyball)
Natasha Alquiros (Basketball & Volleyball)
Richard Juan (Volleyball only)
Justin Quirino (Volleyball only)
Marco Gumabao (Volleyball only)

Additional Cast:
Opening Ceremony Host: Boom Gonzales
Tumitinding Sumusulong: The UAAP Season 78 Primer Host: TJ Manotoc 
UAAP Season 78 Cheerdance Competition Host: Boom Gonzales and Sofia Andres
UAAP Season 78 Beach Volleyball Finals Crew: Ian Laurel and Mozzy Ravena
UAAP Season 78 Baseball and Softball Finals Crew: Anton Roxas and Kiko Diaz
UAAP Season 78 Men's and Women's Tennis Finals Crew: Dyan Castillejo and Eric Tipan
UAAP Season 78 Streetdance Competition Hosts: Justin Quirino and Ai dela Cruz

See also 
 NCAA Season 91

References

 
2015 in Philippine sport
2016 in Philippine sport
78